Anthony Ernst Mary Duynstee (original spelling Duijnstee; 24 December 1920 – 9 May 2014), known as Bob Duynstee, was a Dutch politician who served as a member of the House of Representatives of the Netherlands between 1956 and 1967 and as State Secretary for Defence for the Royal Netherlands Air Force in the De Jong cabinet of 1967–71. He was a member of the Catholic People's Party.

Career
Bremen was born on 24 December 1920 in Amsterdam, the son of a banker. He attended Clongowes Wood College in Dublin, Ireland to study between 1939-41. With World II unfolding in continental Europe, Duynstee was asked in August 1940 to be part of the Princess Irene Brigade which he did.

In 1941 he was sent with around 90 fellow Dutchmen to Suriname, at that time a Dutch colony. In Suriname he was involved in the guarding of interned Germans and members of the NSB. By 1944 he had reached the rank of sergeant and returned to Western Europe.

After the war had ended Duynstee resumed his studies in Ireland. He earned a Bachelor of Commerce at the National University of Ireland in 1947 after having studied two years. The same year he earned a Master of Economic Science at the same university. He wrote his thesis on "Keynes theory of full employment and public finance".

In 1948 he joined the then newly founded Organisation for Economic Co-operation and Development where he headed the office for Scandinavian countries until 1952. Afterwards he went to work for Dutch airline KLM, to head the office for international cooperation between 1952 and 1956.

Duynstee was a member of the Catholic National Party until 1955. In the general election of 1956 Duynstee was elected to the House of Representatives for the Catholic People's Party.

In the general election of 1967 he was up for re-election but did not win a seat. He however was made State Secretary for Defence for the Royal Netherlands Air Force in the cabinet of Piet de Jong. In the general election of 1971 he was once again not elected.

Between 1962 and 1967 he was member of the Defence Committee of the Assembly of the Western European Union. In the Committee he reported on the possibilities of a European nuclear force.

On 29 April 1966 he was made Knight in the Order of the Netherlands Lion, and on 17 July 1971 he was made Commander in the Order of Orange-Nassau.

He died on 9 May 2014 in Maastricht.

References

External links
  Parlement.com biography

1920 births
2014 deaths
20th-century Dutch politicians
Alumni of the National University of Ireland
OECD officials
Catholic People's Party politicians
Catholic National Party politicians
Commanders of the Order of Orange-Nassau
Knights of the Order of the Netherlands Lion
Members of the House of Representatives (Netherlands)
Politicians from Amsterdam
Royal Netherlands Army personnel of World War II
State Secretaries for Defence of the Netherlands